Joaquín de Santiyán y Valdivieso (Arce, Piélagos, Cantabria, 13 January 1733 - Tarragona, 5 July 1783) was bishop of Urgell,  and co-prince of Andorra between 1772 and 1779 and archbishop of Tarragona between 1779 and 1783.

References 

Bishops of Urgell
18th-century Princes of Andorra
Archbishops of Tarragona
1733 births
1783 deaths
18th-century Roman Catholic archbishops in Spain